The 98th Regiment Illinois Volunteer Infantry, later the 98th Regiment Illinois Volunteer Mounted Infantry, was an infantry and mounted infantry regiment that served in the Union Army during the American Civil War.

Service
The 98th Illinois Infantry was organized at Centralia, Illinois and mustered into Federal service on September 3, 1862.

The regiment was converted to mounted infantry on March 8, 1863 and became an element of "Wilder's Lightning Brigade", a unit that pioneered the use of mounted infantry. As part of that brigade, it performed admirably in the Tullahoma and Chickamauga campaigns. Its superior firepower due to its Spencers was found to allow it to take on an enemy that outnumbered them on several occasions and triumph. Also, the rapidity of movement afforded by their mounts gave them a rapid response ability that could take and maintain the initiative from the rebelsThis combat power prevented much larger Confederate units from crossing a bridge on the first day of Chickamauga and stopped the left column of the Bragg's key breakthrough on the second day.

The regiment was mustered out on June 27, 1865, and discharged at Springfield, Illinois, on July 7, 1865.

Total strength and casualties
The regiment suffered 30 enlisted men who were killed in action or who died of their wounds and 5 officers and 136 enlisted men who died of disease, for a total of 171 fatalities.

Commanders
 Colonel John J. Funkhouser - Discharged due to wounds July 5, 1864.

Notes

Bibliography

See also
 List of Illinois Civil War Units
 Illinois in the American Civil War

Units and formations of the Union Army from Illinois
1862 establishments in Illinois
Military units and formations established in 1862
Military units and formations disestablished in 1865